The following lists events that happened during 2000 in Rwanda.

Incumbents 
 President: Pasteur Bizimungu (until 23 March), Paul Kagame (starting 24 March)
 Prime Minister: Pierre-Célestin Rwigema (until 8 March), Bernard Makuza (starting 8 March)

Events

References

 
2000s in Rwanda
Years of the 20th century in Rwanda
Rwanda
Rwanda